The following low-power television stations broadcast on digital or analog channel 45 in the United States:

 K45KS-D in Billings, Montana, to move to channel 19
 W45DN-D in Washington, D.C., to move to channel 10
 WJOS-LD in Pomeroy, Ohio, to move to channel 31

The following stations, which are no longer licensed, formerly broadcast on digital or analog channel 45:
 K45AC in Wenatchee, Washington
 K45AF-D in Parachute, etc., Colorado
 K45AG in Duchesne, Utah
 K45AH in Ukiah, California
 K45AU-D in Follett, Texas
 K45CU in Shiprock, New Mexico
 K45DD in Eureka, Utah
 K45DS-D in Freshwater, etc., California
 K45DY-D in New Mobeetie, Texas
 K45EB in Bozeman, Montana
 K45EJ in Enid, Oklahoma
 K45FW in Price, etc., Utah
 K45FZ in Lewiston, Idaho
 K45GD-D in Romeo, etc., Colorado
 K45GP in Emery, Utah
 K45HW in San Angelo, Texas
 K45IA-D in Rock Springs, Wyoming
 K45IY in Alexandria, Louisiana
 K45JC in Huntsville, Utah
 K45KT-D in Sargents, Colorado
 K45KX-D in Weed, California
 KAZP-LP in Port Arthur, Texas
 KCDR-LD in Cedar Rapids, Iowa
 KCGI-CA in Cape Girardeau, Missouri
 KCTF-LP in Twin Falls, Idaho
 KHDT-LP in Denver, Colorado
 KHPB-CD in Bastrop, Texas
 KJKC-LP in Tonopah, Nevada
 KKRR-LP in Cheyenne, Wyoming
 KLHU-CD in Lake Havasu City, Arizona
 KMDK-LD in Jonesboro, Arkansas
 KWVF-LP in Pinedale, Wyoming
 KWWB-LP in Mesquite, etc., Nevada
 W45CU in Waycross, Georgia
 W45DI-D in Juana Diaz, Puerto Rico
 W45DJ-D in Panama City, Florida
 W45ED-D in Clarksdale, Mississippi
 WMUN-CD in Mineola, New York
 WVVK-LP in Martin, Kentucky

References

45 low-power